Natranaerobius thermophilus is a thermophilic, obligately anaerobic and halophilic bacterium from the genus of Natranaerobius which has been isolated from the Wadi An Natrun lake in Egypt.

References

Further reading

External links
microbewiki

Bacteria described in 2007
Natranaerobiales